Macromia pacifica, the gilded river cruiser, is a species of cruiser in the dragonfly family Macromiidae. It is found in North America.

The IUCN conservation status of Macromia pacifica is "LC", least concern, with no immediate threat to the species' survival. The IUCN status was reviewed in 2017.

References

External links

Macromiidae
Articles created by Qbugbot
Insects described in 1861